Hualong District is a district of city of Puyang, Henan province, China.

Administrative divisions
As 2012, this district is divided to 10 subdistricts, 5 townships and 2 others.
Subdistricts

Townships

Others
Puyang Development Zone
Baitiaohe Farm

References

County-level divisions of Henan
Puyang